Rahadyan Timoteo Sastrowardoyo (born March 31, 1963, in New York City) is a writer, editor and photographer. He is an American of Indonesian and Filipino ancestry.

Sastrowardoyo was raised on the Upper West Side of Manhattan, and attended P.S. 163 and The Collegiate School as an elementary school student.

His tertiary education was at New York University and The New School.

Career
Sastrowardoyo began his journalism career as a reporter, copy editor and photographer on his junior high school and high school newspapers in Brentwood, New York. He was editor-in-chief of the Brentwood High School yearbook in 1981, which won honorable mentions from the American Scholastic Press Association and the Columbia Scholastic Press Association. Sastrowardoyo was also news director for WXBA-FM.

His first paying job was as an events photographer for the Brentwood school district. He has since dabbled in wedding photography, wedding videography, dance photography, and theatrical photography for Deborah Savadge's Woodstock Theatre Company (based in New Paltz, New York) and Algonquin Productions

After working at Banque Indosuez, Dial Germany/Dial Bavaria (a travel wholesaler) and Marubeni America Corporation, Sastrowardoyo was hired as a copyboy at The New York Times in the fall of 1987. From 1988 to 2006, he was on the staff of the cultural news desk, and named a staff editor in 1999. From March 2006 to December 2009, he worked on the foreign news desk. Sastrowardoyo worked at the Timess United Nations bureau in November and December 2007.

Sastrowardoyo studied acting with Deborah Savadge beginning in the fall of 1989, ostensibly as a means to help him deal with his shyness. It was instrumental in helping him deal with his brother Sabartomo's death a few years previously. He has also studied poetry with Kimiko Hahn, Richard Tayson and Li-Young Lee; performance with Beau Sia and the Asian American troupe Peeling; playwriting with Julia Cho and David Henry Hwang; photography with Charles Gatewood; dance with Ducky DooLittle and Pamardi Tjiptopradonggo; and writing with Rachel Kramer Bussel and Paul Levitz.

In 1989 and 1990, Sastrowardoyo was a contributing editor for volumes 7 and 8 of Contemporary Theater, Film and Television, a reference series published by Gale Research (now known as Thomson Gale).

In the summer of 1990, Sastrowardoyo and some classmates from Deborah Savadge's acting class (directed by Guy Ventoliere) performed a series of one-act plays, originally performed by the Actors Theatre of Louisville, as a benefit for Coalition for the Homeless.

Sastrowardoyo gave a poetry reading at the Asian American Writers Workshop in January 2000. His one-act play, Lessons Learned, was scheduled to be read at AAWW on September 11, 2001, but the events of that day postponed its reading until September 24, 2001.

Sastrowardoyo retired from the Times in 2009.

Personal
Sastrowardoyo is the eldest son of Sumarsongko H. Sastrowardoyo (1929-2018), born in Bandung, West Java, Indonesia, of the Economics and Information staff of the Consulate General of Indonesia, and Teresita M. Sastrowardoyo (1933-2020), born in Maasin, Iloilo, the Philippines, an operating room registered nurse. They were married at Calvary Baptist Church in New York City in 1962.

Sastrowardoyo's middle brother, Sabartomo (1965–1986), died in an accident while a student at Cornell University.Cornell's Morbid History His youngest brother, Hartriono B. Sastrowardoyo (b. 1969), is a reporter and online producerhttp://www.maryfrancen.com/Recomendation-Hart.pdf  for the Asbury Park Press.

Sastrowardoyo is a nephew of Soenario (1902–1997), Indonesia's minister of foreign affairs from 1953 to 1955; and Subagio Sastrowardoyo (1924–1995), a noted poet, writer, essayist and literary critic. He is also a cousin of Sunaryati Hartono (b. 1931) and Astrid Susanto (1936–2006), officials in the Indonesian government; and Marina Joesoef (b. 1959), an Indonesian artist.

Sastrowardoyo is a first cousin once removed of the Indonesian actress Dian Sastrowardoyo (b. 1982).

His surname is derived from shastra (Sanskrit, writings) and hridaya (Sanskrit, heart), so literally means "writings of the heart." His given name reportedly means "of noble blood" or "noble-hearted." His first middle name was after his maternal grandfather, who died in 1952.

His paternal grandfather, Sutejo Sastrowardoyo (1878–1967), traced the family's ancestry back to 15th century Java.

Sastrowardoyo was raised Baptist but left the church in 1978. He became a Muslim revert after the events of 9/11, when his former minister in Central Islip, New York opined that God had used Muslims as an instrument of His wrath against a decadent America.

Trivia
 Sastrowardoyo was one of the subjects of a practical joke on April 1, 2001, where his name was put in place of an actor's name in The New York Times 's database of films.Amster, Linda and McClain, Dylan Loeb, eds. Kill Duck Before Serving: Red Faces at The New York Times: A Collection of the Newspaper's Most Interesting, Embarrassing and Off-Beat Corrections. New York: St. Martin's Griffin, 2002.  
 Sastrowardoyo wears a bracelet on his right wrist in memory of Michael H. Waye, a junior high and high school friend who was killed in the 9/11 attacks.
 On September 25, 2011, Sastrowardoyo spoke briefly at the memorial service for Nathaniel Rand, a Cornell University student who had died in a similar manner to Sastrowardoyo's brother Sabartomo."Spectre of gorge injuries in mind, Cornell offers free shuttle buses to Treman State Park." 14850 Today, 12 August 2012.
 Sastrowardoyo was tuckerized as a character in Dayton Ward's Star Trek novel, The Fall: Peaceable Kingdoms, published in December 2013.

Bibliography

JournalismPrint "Babylon 5 Enters Its Final Stages." The New York Times, 19 July 1998.
 "Writing away for tickets, or trying to get on camera." (sidebar to Matt Lee and Ted Lee's "American Cities: Who Wants to Be in the Audience?") The New York Times, 14 May 2000.
 "For Young Viewers: Pooh's New Adventures, in a 100-Gigabyte Wood." The New York Times, 21 January 2001.
 Review of Better Luck Tomorrow. Community News (Browns Mills, NJ), 2002.Online "Flashpoints That Define Or Break Apart a Community." Rediff.com, 01 June 1999 Accessed 27 March 2007.

Fandom journalism
Sastrowardoyo has written book reviews, wedding coverage, an obituary, an essay on 9/11 and an article on The Explorers Club (co-written with Hartriono B. Sastrowardoyo) for the Communiqué, a publication of STARFLEET International.

Photography
 Daily Freeman (Kingston, NY), 2002.
 Chronogram Magazine (New Paltz, NY), 2002.

BooksAs contributing editor'''
 Contemporary Theatre, Film and Television,'' volumes 7 and 8. Detroit: Gale Research, 1989 and 1990.

Notes

1963 births
Living people
Javanese people
Hiligaynon people
American editors
American photographers
American people of Indonesian descent
American people of Javanese descent
Rahadyan
Brentwood High School (Brentwood, New York) alumni
New York University alumni
The New York Times writers
Converts to Islam from Protestantism
American writers of Filipino descent
American former Protestants
Former Baptists